Ekinözü is a town and district of Kahramanmaraş Province in the Mediterranean region of Turkey.

See also 
 İğde - a belde between Ekinözü and Elbistan

References

Populated places in Kahramanmaraş Province
Districts of Kahramanmaraş Province
Towns in Turkey
Kurdish settlements in Turkey